VJAA is an American architectural firm based in Minneapolis, Minnesota.  The firm is the recipient of the 2012 National American Institute of Architects Firm Award. VJAA was founded in 1995 and is led by Vincent James FAIA, Jennifer Yoos FAIA and Nathan Knutson AIA, Managing Principal.  Recent projects include the Charles Hostler Student Center at the American University of Beirut, the Guesthouse at Saint John's Abbey, the new Walker Library in Minneapolis and the Welland International Flatwater Centre for the Toronto 2015 Pan Am games. The firm's work has been published in Architecture, Architectural Record, Architecture Review (UK), A+U (Japan), The New York Times, Perspecta, Praxis, and in a number of books in the U.S. and in France, Germany, the Netherlands, Spain, the U.K., India, China, and South America.

Awards

VJAA has received twenty-three national design awards, including six National American Institute of Architects Honor Awards, six Progressive Architecture Awards, and two American Institute of Architects/Committee on the Environment Top Ten Green Building Awards. In 2010, Architect magazine ranked VJAA first in the United States for design recognition. In 2001, the firm received the Award in Architecture from the American Academy of Arts and Letters.

Significant Works

Welland International Flatwater Centre, Toronto 2015 Pan Am Games, (2014)
Walker Library, Minneapolis, Minnesota, (2014)
New African Art Galleries, Minneapolis Institute of Arts, (2013)
Blessed Sacrament Chapel, Saint John's Abbey and Monastery, Collegeville, Minnesota, (2008)		
Hostler Student Recreation Center and Corniche Frontage, Beirut, Lebanon, (2008)
Church Pavilion and Blessed Sacrament Chapel, Saint John's Abbey and Monastery, Collegeville, Minnesota, (2007)
Abbey Guesthouse, Saint John's Abbey and Monastery, Collegeville, Minnesota, Completed (2007)
The Lavin-Bernick Center for University Life, Tulane University, New Orleans, Louisiana, (2007)
University of Wisconsin-Madison Crewhouse, Madison, Wisconsin, (2004)
Minneapolis Rowing Club Boathouse, Minneapolis, Minnesota, (2001)

Resources

Thermally Active Surfaces in Architecture by Kiel Moe.  New York: Princeton Architectural  Press.
Ecological Architecture by Chris Van Uffelen. Berlin: Markus Sebastian Braun. 
Integrated Design in Contemporary Architecture by Kiel Moe. New York: Princeton Architectural Press. 
Key Contemporary Buildings by Rob Gregory. London: Lawrence King Publishing.
VJAA (Monograph) Introduction by Hashim Sarkis. New York: Princeton Architectural Press, November 2006. 
The Phaidon Atlas of 21st Century World Architecture.  “U.S.A.-East.” New York: Phaidon Press.

External links
VJAA website
AIA National Firm Award

References

Architecture firms based in Minnesota